Albert Simon Cahen (12 July 1877 – 20 December 1937) was a French fencer. He competed in the individual foil and épée events at the 1900 Summer Olympics.

References

External links
 

1877 births
1937 deaths
French male épée fencers
French male foil fencers
Olympic fencers of France
Fencers at the 1900 Summer Olympics
Fencers from Paris